Princess Ida of Anhalt-Bernburg-Schaumburg-Hoym (10 March 1804 – 31 March 1828) was a princess of Anhalt-Bernburg-Schaumburg-Hoym by birth as a daughter of Victor II, Prince of Anhalt-Bernburg-Schaumburg-Hoym. As the wife of Hereditary Prince Paul Frederick Augustus of Oldenburg she became an Hereditary Princess of Oldenburg by marriage.

Birth and family
Princess Ida, born on 10 March 1804 at Schaumburg Castle, was the fourth and youngest daughter of Victor II, Prince of Anhalt-Bernburg-Schaumburg-Hoym, and of Princess Amelia of Nassau-Weilburg. Ida had three older sisters: Hermine, Adelheid, and Emma. She grew up with her sisters in Hoym in Anhalt.

Marriage
Ida married Hereditary Prince Paul Frederick Augustus of Oldenburg on 24 June 1825 at Oldenburg. He was the eldest son of Peter, Reigning Duke of Oldenburg, and had previously been married to Ida's older sister Adelheid.

The princess was just 21 years old when she married the 41-year-old duke. Augustus and Ida had one son, Peter, who was born in 1827 and would later succeed Augustus as Grand Duke.

Death
Just like her sister, Princess Ida died after three years of marriage, in 1828.

Augustus became Grand Duke of Oldenburg in 1829. In 1831, he married for the third time to Princess Cecilia of Sweden.

The settlement Idafehn in East Frisia in Lower Saxony, Germany is named after Princess Ida.

Ancestry and descent

Ancestry

Issue

External links

1804 births
1828 deaths
House of Ascania
House of Oldenburg in Oldenburg
House of Holstein-Gottorp
Burials at the Ducal Mausoleum, Gertrudenfriedhof (Oldenburg)
Daughters of monarchs